FC MEN is an all-star subunit of the South Korean football club Suwon Bluewings, composed of actors, singers, models and plays charity matches. The team officially joined Suwon Bluewings in April 2011 and wears the Bluewings uniform. FC MEN is headed by pop group JYJ's member Kim Junsu. In 2011, FC MEN won the Peace Star Cup against Miracle FC at the Suwon World Cup Stadium. The team's honorary coach is the South Korean national team's goalkeeper Jung Sung-Ryong.

Current squad

See also 
 Suwon Samsung Bluewings

References

External links
 FC MEN Official Japanese website
 

Charity fundraisers (people)